The Hungry Ones was an Australian television mini-series. It was a period drama about a pair of husband and wife convicts trying to go straight, consisting of 10 30-minute black-and-white episodes, which aired on ABC. Unlike previous serials it was videotaped rather than performed live to camera.

Notably, the cast included Leonard Teale and Fay Kelton. Also appearing were Edward Hepple, Nigel Lovell, John Ewart, and Brigid Lenihan.

The archival status of the series is not known. It was among a series of four historical mini-series broadcast by ABC in the early 1960s, which had proved successful enough to encourage commercial broadcaster Seven Network to produce their own such series, Jonah, in 1962.

Cast
 Leonard Teale as Will Bryant
Fay Kelton as Mary Bryant
Edward Hepple as Governor Phillip	
Nigel Lovell 
John Ewart 
Brigid Lenihan
James Elliott 
Neil Fitzpatrick 
John Gray 
Ronald Morse 
Stan Polonsky 
John Unicomb

Production
Rex Rienits, who had written Stormy Petrel and The Outcasts but not Patriots, wrote episodes in London where he was living and sent them on.

Filming started June 1963 at Gore Hill.

It was an early TV role for Leonard Teale.

Episodes
Ep 1–7 July (Syd), 21 July (Melb) - meet the Bryants in Cornwall in 1784
Ep 2–14 July (Syd), 28 July (Melb) - "Bound for Botany Bay"
Ep 3–21 July (Syd), 4 Aug (Melb)
Ep 4–28 July (Syd), 11 Aug Melb)
Ep 5 - 4 Aug (Syd) 18 Aug (Melb) - "Days of Famine"
Ep 6 - 11 Aug (Syd) 25 Aug (Melb)
Ep 7 - 18 Aug (Syd) 1 Sept (Melb)
Ep 8 - 25 Aug (Syd) 8 Sept (Melb) - "The Escape"
Ep 9 - 1 Sept (Syd) 15 Sept (Melb)
Ep 10 - 8 Sept (Syd) 22 Sept (Melb) - final episode

Reception
An article in the 18 March 1964 edition of Australian Women's Weekly stated that the historical serials were "very good entertainment" with the exception of The Hungry Ones

References

External links

Australian drama television series
1963 Australian television series debuts
1963 Australian television series endings
Australian Broadcasting Corporation original programming
Black-and-white Australian television shows
English-language television shows
Period television series
Television shows set in colonial Australia